The Bern Open was an annual curling tournament held at the Bern CC in Bern, Switzerland. It was part of the World Curling Tour, and took place during the 7th week of the tour. The tournament was held using a triple-knockout format.

Past champions
Only skip's name is displayed.

External links
Bern CC

Former World Curling Tour events
Curling competitions in Switzerland
Sport in Bern